The Dongdan Kingdom (926–936) (Khitan language: Dan Gur,) was a puppet kingdom established by the Liao dynasty to rule the former realm of Balhae (Bohai) in eastern Manchuria.

History 
After conquering Balhae (Bohai) in 926, the Liao crown prince Yelü Bei ascended to the throne of Dongdan at the Huhan fortress, the former capital of Balhae, in today's Mudanjiang, Heilongjiang Province. The state used Dongdan as its Chinese name, meaning the Eastern Dan Gur (Bohai), in respect to the Liao dynasty in the west.

However, political tension soon evolved between Yelü Bei and his younger brother Yelü Deguang, who took the imperial throne of the Liao dynasty after their father Yelü Abaoji died, en route to his homeland from a relatively successful campaign against the Later Tang. The new emperor ordered his elder brother to move his capital from Huhan in eastern Manchuria to Liaoyang in western Manchuria.

Yelü Bei obeyed the imperial order but soon fled to North China to avoid possible assassination in 930. Yelü Bei's son was elevated to the new king of Dongdan, but the kingdom was annexed by the Liao dynasty in 936. A minority of historians suggest Dongdan was annexed in 982. On the other hand some believe that Dongdan was never a "independent kingdom", but the former area of Balhae was instantly annexed in 926 by the Liao dynasty.

To continue Balhae's friendly relations with Japan, Dongdan sent a diplomatic mission over the Sea of Japan in 929. But the Japanese court in Kyoto rejected the mission from Dongdan, due to loyalty for the old Balhae regime.

See also 
 Emperors family tree
 Liao dynasty
 Northern Liao
 Qara Khitai

Notes

History of Manchuria
Balhae
Former countries in Chinese history
History of Siberia
Khitan history
10th century in Asia
936 disestablishments
States and territories established in the 920s
926 establishments